ACIM may refer to

A Course in Miracles, a spiritual book by Helen Schucman
An AC induction motor
 Associate Member of the Chartered Institute of Marketing